John Hollingworth may refer to:

 John Hollingworth (politician) (1930–2018), British Conservative politician
 John Hollingworth (actor) (fl. 2000s–2010s), English actor
 John Hollingworth (priest) (1803–1856), Archdeacon of Huntington

See also 
 John Hollingsworth (1916–1963), a British orchestral conductor
 Hollingworth (surname)